Yarningale Aqueduct is one of three aqueducts on a  length of the Stratford-upon-Avon Canal in Warwickshire.  It spans the Kingswood Brook near the village of Claverdon.  All three aqueducts are unusual in that the towpaths are at the level of the canal bottom.

It leads into the 34th lock – "Bucket Lock" – on the canal, the middle of a three-lock flight in the Claverdon area.

In 1834, the aqueduct was destroyed by flooding of the two waterways, caused by a surge from the nearby Grand Union Canal.  It was rebuilt in cast iron the same year by Horseley Ironworks.

Images

References

External links 

Stratford-upon-Avon Canal
Grade II* listed buildings in Warwickshire
Navigable aqueducts in England
Buildings and structures in Warwickshire
Grade II* listed bridges in England
Grade II* listed canals
Bridges in Warwickshire
Canals in Warwickshire
Cast iron aqueducts